Isabelle Collin Dufresne (6 September 1935 – 14 June 2014), known professionally as Ultra Violet, was a French-American artist, author, and both a colleague of Andy Warhol and one of his so-called Superstars. Earlier in her career, she worked for and studied with surrealist artist Salvador Dalí. Dufresne lived and worked in New York City, and also had a studio in Nice, France.

Early life 
Isabelle Collin Dufresne was brought up in a strict religious upper-middle-class family, but she rebelled at an early age. She was instructed at a Catholic school, and then a reform school. In 1953, she received a BA in Art at Le Sacré Cœur in Grenoble, France.  She soon left France to live with an older sister in New York City.

Salvador Dalí and New York City 
In 1954, after a meeting with Salvador Dalí, she became his "muse", pupil, studio assistant, and lover in both Port Lligat, Spain, and in New York City.  Later, she would recall, "I realized that I was 'surreal', which I never knew until I met Dalí." In the 1960s, Dufresne began to follow the progressive American Pop Art scene including Jasper Johns, Robert Rauschenberg, and James Rosenquist.

Warhol and "The Factory" 

In 1963, Dalí introduced Dufresne to Andy Warhol at the Saint Regis New York Hotel, and soon she moved into the orbit of his unorthodox studio, "The Factory". In 1964 she selected the stage name "Ultra Violet" at Warhol's suggestion, because it was her preferred fashion — her hair color at the time was often violet or lilac. She became one of many "superstars" in Warhol's Factory, and played multiple roles in over a dozen films between 1965 and 1974.

In 1967, Ultra Violet played a part (with, among others, Taylor Mead) in the surrealistic play Desire Caught by the Tail by Pablo Picasso when it was set for the first time in France at a festival in Saint-Tropez. She followed this appearance by starring in John Chamberlain's The Secret Life of Hernando Cortez (1969), filmed in Mexico and co-starring Taylor Mead. She would eventually appear in more than 20 films, not counting numerous documentaries made at the Factory.

At various points in her career she would meet numerous celebrities, including John Graham, John Chamberlain, Edward Ruscha, Rudolf Nureyev, Miloš Forman, Howard Hughes, Richard Nixon, Aristotle Onassis, Maria Callas, Marcel Duchamp, Man Ray, Marc Chagall, Bob Dylan, John Lennon, and Yoko Ono. In later reminiscences, she would name Ruscha, Nureyev, and Forman among her past lovers.

In 1969, she was "dethroned" as Warhol's primary muse by Viva, a more recent discovery. In addition to numerous Warhol productions, Dufresne did appear among other Factory colleagues in the 1969 film Midnight Cowboy, and in the 1971 film, Taking Off, directed by Forman.

Although a full participant in activities at the Factory, she generally avoided the heavy drug usage prevalent at the time, saying that her body reacted badly to drugs. She had tried smoking as a rebellious teen, had gotten very sick as a result, and resolved to abstain from drug usage. She would later observe, "If I had lived like all those young people, I would be dead today".

In the 1970s and 1980s, she gradually drifted away from the Factory scene, taking a lower profile and working independently on her own art.  In her autobiography, published the year after Warhol's unexpected demise in 1987, she chronicled the activities of many Warhol superstars, including several untimely deaths during and after the Factory years.

Later career 

In 1988, Ultra Violet published her autobiography, Famous for 15 Minutes: My Years with Andy Warhol. This autobiography was edited extensively and partially translated from French to English by her New York penthouse roommate Natalie Durkee. After a review of the book in The New York Times, it was published worldwide, eventually in 17 languages.  After a book tour, she returned to France; in 1990 she opened a studio in Nice and wrote another book detailing her own ideas about art, L'Ultratique. She lived and worked as an artist in New York City, and also maintained a studio in Nice for the rest of her life.

In 2000, she was featured in Message to Andy Warhol, a "concept art documentary" by Laurent Foissac.

On 10 April 2005, she joined a panel discussion "Reminiscences of Dalí: A Conversation with Friends of the Artist" as part of a symposium "The Dalí Renaissance" for a major retrospective show at the Philadelphia Museum of Art. Her conversation with another former Dalí protégée, French singer/actress Amanda Lear, is recorded in the 236-page exhibition catalog, The Dalí Renaissance: New Perspectives on His Life and Art after 1940.

In 2006, she had a solo show at Stefan Stux Gallery in Chelsea, Manhattan. In 2007 she gave a retrospective lecture at the New York Institute of Technology.

In 2010, filmmaker David Gerson released Ultra Violet for Sixteen Minutes, a short documentary showing her perspectives on fame, art, religion, and her current artistic practice.

In 2011, she was featured in a brief article about the surviving former Warhol "Superstars".
Regarding her famous past and her artwork today, she has said, "People always want to know about the past, but I'm much more interested in tomorrow". In 2011, she exhibited a series of artworks as her personal memorial of the September 11 attacks, which were displayed in the exhibit Memorial IX XI at Queensborough Community College.

In a 2012 interview, she said, "I'm a New Yorker, I'm an American, and I'm an artist. Because of those three things, I had to do something about 9/11, and the question was what to do, which is not simple."

She gave her last TV interview for the German documentary about obsessive–compulsive disorder (OCD), Wie ich lernte, die Zahlen zu lieben (How I Learned to Love the Numbers), by Oliver Sechting and Max Taubert.

In 2014, she exhibited in four different solo and group shows, in New York and in Nice.
Her last exhibition at the Dillon Gallery in Manhattan, Ultra Violet: The Studio Recreated, closed three weeks before her death. It included paintings, sculptures, photographs, films, and neon art. Three of her sculptures are in the permanent collection of the 9/11 Museum.

On 12 August 2014, independent record label Refinersfire released a posthumous limited edition 2-disc collection of original music and private conversations of Ultra Violet and Andy Warhol. The music was recorded in the late 1960s and early 1970s, and features cover performances of "La vie en Rose", "Mojo Queen", and the original songs "Famous for Fifteen Minutes" and "Moon Rock". Ultra Violet also had recorded private telephone conversations between herself and Andy Warhol, which feature topics such as police harassment, their films, the business of art, the RFK assassination, and Valerie Solanas and her attempt on Warhol's life.

Personal life 
In 1973, a near-death experience with an ulcerated colon and a bout with depression launched Ultra Violet on a spiritual quest, culminating in her baptism in 1981.  For the rest of her life, she was a practicing member of the Church of Jesus Christ of Latter-day Saints. She also became involved in charity work, saying "I am learning, the hard way, that life is about service".

In 1994, the New Yorker magazine published a brief article describing a dream she had had on the night Andy Warhol died, in 1987. She did not even know that he was in the hospital at that time, and was shocked to hear a report on the radio the next morning.

Dufresne died on 14 June 2014, in New York City at the age of 78, from cancer. She had never married. Dufresne was survived by two sisters. She is buried in Saint-Égrève near Grenoble.

Books

Filmography 
 Blackout (1994) .... Arlette
 An Unmarried Woman (1978) .... Lady MacBeth
 Curse of the Headless Horseman (1974) .... Contessa Isabel du Fren
 Bad Charleston Charlie (1973)
 Savages (1972) .... Iliona, a Decadent
 Believe in Me (1971) .... Emergency Room Patient
 The Telephone Book (1971) .... Whip Woman
 Simon, King of the Witches (1971) .... Sarah
 Taking Off (1971) .... SPFC Member
 Dinah East (1970) .... Daniela
 Brand X (1970) .... Singer
 The Phynx (1970) .... Felice
 Cleopatra (1970)
 Maidstone (1970) .... Herself
 Midnight Cowboy (1969) .... The Party
 The Secret Life of Hernando Cortez (1969) .... Daughter of Montezuma
 **** (The 24 Hour Movie) (1967)
 I, a Man (1967)
 The Life of Juanita Castro (1965)
 Cinématon #1084 (1988) by Gérard Courant ... Herself
 Lire #27 (1988) by Gérard Courant ... Herself
 Portrait de groupe #92 : Avec Ultra-Violet à Paris by Gérard Courant ... Herself
 La Collection secrète de Salvador Dalí (1992) by Otto Kelmer ... Herself 
 Message to Andy Warhol (2000) by Laurent Foissac ... Herself
 Wie ich lernte, die Zahlen zu lieben (2014) by Oliver Sechting & Max Taubert ... Herself

See also 
 Louise Bourgeois
 Niki de Saint Phalle

References

External links 

Warholstars, a comprehensive website about Andy Warhol
Official Site of Ultra Violet's IXXI project

1935 births
People from La Tronche
2014 deaths
American women artists
American film actresses
Latter Day Saints from New York (state)
Artists from New York City
Converts to Mormonism from Roman Catholicism
French Latter Day Saints
French women writers
French emigrants to the United States
Deaths from cancer in New York (state)
People associated with The Factory
Muses